Douglas Township is one of seventeen townships in Boone County, Iowa, USA.  As of the 2000 census, its population was 2,344.

History
Douglas Township was established in 1858.

Geography
According to the USGS, it contains four cemeteries: Cassel, Dalander, Fairview and Mount Hope.

References

External links
 US-Counties.com
 City-Data.com

Townships in Boone County, Iowa
Townships in Iowa
1858 establishments in Iowa